The 2021–22 UNC Asheville Bulldogs men's basketball team represented the University of North Carolina at Asheville in the 2021–22 NCAA Division I men's basketball season. The Bulldogs, led by fourth-year head coach Mike Morrell, played their home games at Kimmel Arena in Asheville, North Carolina, as members of the Big South Conference. With the reintroduction of divisions for the first time since the 2013–14 season, the Bulldogs played in the South division. They finished the regular season 16–13, 8–8 in Big South play which resulted in a fourth place in the South division. As the No. 5 seed in the Big South tournament, they lost to Charleston Southern in the first round.

The Bulldogs participated in the College Basketball Invitational as a No. 13 seed, where they defeated No. 4 Stephen F. Austin in the first round before losing to No. 12 Northern Colorado in the quarterfinals.

Previous season
In a season limited due to the ongoing COVID-19 pandemic, the Bulldogs finished the 2020–21 season 10–10, 9–5 in Big South play to finish in fourth place. They were defeated by Longwood in the quarterfinals of the Big South tournament.

Preseason 
The Bulldogs were picked to finish in second place in the South division in a preseason poll. The team returned six of their top seven scorers from the prior season, including guard Tajion Jones who entered the season as the Big South's active leader in career points (1,058).

Roster

Schedule and results
During the non-conference half of the season, the Bulldogs used a balanced attack (Tajion Jones, Drew Pember, and LJ Thorpe all averaging 10-15 points per game) to begin the conference half with the best record in either division of the Big South.
|-
!colspan=12 style=| Non-conference regular season

|-
!colspan=12 style=| Big South regular season

|-
!colspan=9 style=| Big South tournament

|-
!colspan=9 style=|CBI

Source

References

UNC Asheville Bulldogs men's basketball seasons
UNC Asheville Bulldogs
UNC Asheville Bulldogs men's basketball
UNC Asheville Bulldogs men's basketball
UNC Asheville